The Jönköping Theatre is a theatre in Jönköping, Sweden, which is also used for concerts. It was opened on 2 December 1904.

References

External links
Programbolaget 

1904 establishments in Sweden
Buildings and structures in Jönköping
Theatres completed in 1904
Theatres in Sweden
Culture in Jönköping
Music venues completed in 1904